Stenoma macraulax is a moth in the family Depressariidae. It was described by Edward Meyrick in 1930. It is found in Brazil (Rio de Janeiro).

The wingspan is about 34 mm. The forewings are light brownish-ochreous, with some scattered dark fuscous specks on the dorsal third, the costal edge and all veins except on the dorsal third marked with fuscous lines, some fuscous suffusion towards the costa on the anterior half. The plical and second discal stigmata are small and dark fuscous, an additional dot on the lower end of the transverse vein and a faint transverse series of fuscous specks towards the termen. There is also a marginal series of dark fuscous dots around the apical part of the costa and termen. The hindwings are whitish-grey-ochreous, faintly greyer below the middle posteriorly.

References

Moths described in 1930
Taxa named by Edward Meyrick
Stenoma